The 2022 Philippine Basketball Association (PBA) Philippine Cup Finals was a best-of-7 championship series of the 2022 PBA Philippine Cup, and the conclusion of the conference's playoffs. The San Miguel Beermen and the TNT Tropang Giga competed for the 44th Philippine Cup championship and the 131st overall championship contested by the league.

A rematch of the 2019 Commissioner's Cup Finals, where the 7-seeded Beermen upset the top-seeded TNT Tropang Giga (then known as TNT KaTropa), San Miguel defeated TNT in seven hard-fought games to win their 28th title in franchise history. Having previously defeated the Magnolia Hotshots last year, TNT entered the series as the defending Philippine Cup champions. June Mar Fajardo was named the Finals MVP for this series.

Background

Road to the finals

Head-to-head matchup

Series summary

Game summaries

Game 1

Jayson Castro hits a jumper with no time left to win the game 86–84. The shot was counted by officials and TNT took a 1–0 series lead.

Game 2

Game 3

Game 4
Prior to the game, San Miguel's June Mar Fajardo was awarded his ninth Best Player of the Conference award, extending his record for most BPC awards in a career.

Game 5

Game 6

Game 7

The TNT entered the game without Chot Reyes, who was out due to health and safety protocols. Starting center Poy Erram was ejected with 55 seconds left in the second quarter after hitting Mo Tautuaa's head during a foul.

After trailing 84–89 by the end of the 3rd quarter, San Miguel used a 17–0 run at the start of the 4th quarter to clinch their 28th title overall, and 9th title under coach Leo Austria. This fourth quarter rally is led by CJ Perez's 25 points in the game. San Miguel won their 6th Philippine Cup title in the past 8 years. They previously have won five straight Philippine Cup titles from 2015 to 2019.

Rosters

{| class="toccolours" style="font-size: 95%; width: 100%;"
|-
! colspan="2" style="background-color: #; color: #; text-align: center;" | San Miguel Beermen 2022 PBA Philippine Cup roster
|- style="background-color:#; color: #; text-align: center;"
! Players !! Coaches
|-
| valign="top" |
{| class="sortable" style="background:transparent; margin:0px; width:100%;"
! Pos. !! # !! POB !! Name !! Height !! Weight !! !! College 
|-

{| class="toccolours" style="font-size: 95%; width: 100%;"
|-
! colspan="2" style="background-color: #; color: #; text-align: center;" | TNT Tropang Giga 2022 PBA Philippine Cup roster
|- style="background-color:#; color: #; text-align: center;"
! Players !! Coaches
|-
| valign="top" |
{| class="sortable" style="background:transparent; margin:0px; width:100%;"
! Pos. !! # !! POB !! Name !! Height !! Weight !! !! College 
|-

Broadcast notes
The Philippine Cup Finals was aired on TV5 & One Sports with simulcast on PBA Rush SMART Sports Facebook Livestream & Smart GigaPlay App (both in standard and high definition).

The PBA Rush broadcast provided English language coverage of the Finals.

The SMART Sports broadcast provided English-Filipino language coverage of the Finals.

Additional Game 7 crew:
Trophy presentation: Jutt Sulit & Bea Escudero
Celebration interviewer: Denise Tan

Notes

References

External links
PBA official website

2022
2022–23 PBA season
PBA Philippine Cup Finals
PBA Philippine Cup Finals
TNT Tropang Giga games
San Miguel Beermen games